"Good Times" is a song by Australian boy band CDB, released in August 1997 as the lead single from their second studio album, Lifted (1997). The song peaked at number 28 on the ARIA Charts.

Track listing
'''CD single (664738 2)
 "Good Times" – 4:00
 "When You Need Somebody"  (Rockmelons Mix)  – 3:56
 "Good Times"  (M1:11 Remix)  – 4:11
 "Good Times"  (Instrumental)   – 3:59

Charts
"Good Times" debuted in Australia at number 46. It peaked at number 28 in September 1997. It remained in the top 50 for 12 weeks.

References

1997 singles
CDB (band) songs
1997 songs
Sony Music Australia singles
Songs written by Andrew De Silva